Barkat Ali is a male Muslim given name, composed of the elements Barkat or Barakat meaning blessings, and Ali meaning of the most high. it may refer to

Barkat Ali (boxer) (born 1935), Pakistani Olympic boxer
Malik Barkat Ali (1886–1946), Indian politician, lawyer, journalist and academic
Sufi Barkat Ali (1911–1997), Indian Sufi saint
 Barkat Ali Khan Mukarram Jah Asaf Jah VIII, known as Prince Mukarram Jah (born 1933), Head of the House of the Nizam of Hyderabad

Arabic masculine given names